Te Rua Reihana Tipoki (born 11 August 1975 in Te Puia Springs, New Zealand) brought up in Te Araroa in Gisborne, is a rugby union player who captained North Harbour to Ranfurly Shield victory in 2006. Tipoki played for a wide variety of teams including Munster Rugby. He currently plays for Ruatoria-based East Coast.

Early career in New Zealand
In his early career he played for Auckland Blues and Otago Highlanders in the Super 12 and the New Zealand 7s. He also played a major part in the Bay of Plenty Steamers first Ranfurly Shield win in 2004, played in the New Zealand Maori team which defeated the British and Irish Lions team for the first time ever in the history of Maori rugby in 2005, and led North Harbour to their first Ranfurly Shield victory in 2006.

Munster
With Munster, he fashioned one of the best centre partnerships in the Heineken Cup with Lifeimi Mafi, playing with passion and flair, a strong tackle and a great handoff and step. He was part of the Munster team that won the Heineken Cup on 24 May 2008 beating Toulouse 16–13 in the final. In all he made 29 appearances (including 27 competitive & 10 Heineken Cup games) for Munster, scoring 3 tries.

On 24 April 2009 Tipoki announced that he would return to his native New Zealand at the end of the season due to a hamstring injury that had consistently hampered him: "It has been a deeply frustrating time for me as I would dearly love to get back to helping the boys achieve the goals that they'd set out at the start of the year. At the minute however, I am not up to the level of fitness required and would not like to do the jersey or the team an injustice by taking the field when I know I can't give my all. This time in Munster has been brilliant for me and my family and while there is only one place you can call home, we will leave Munster with some great memories and having made lifelong friends."

East Coast comeback
After a couple of years of recuperation in New Zealand, in 2011 Tipoki signed for the Ruatoria based team, East Coast. In 2012 he captained the side to win the Meads Cup.

References

External links
Munster Profile
Profile on North Harbour Rugby Union site

1975 births
Bay of Plenty rugby union players
Blues (Super Rugby) players
Living people
Munster Rugby players
Māori All Blacks players
New Zealand rugby union players
People from Te Puia Springs
Rugby union centres
People educated at Waitakere College
Rugby union players from the Gisborne Region